Marco Antonio Vidal Amaro (born February 21, 1986) is an American former professional soccer player.

Vidal has played for C.F. Ciudad Juárez in the Primera División de México, however he was unable to prevent the club from being relegated following the close of the 2010 tournament.

References

External links
 
 
 

1986 births
Living people
Liga MX players
American soccer players
Association football midfielders
American sportspeople of Mexican descent
American expatriate soccer players
Indios de Ciudad Juárez footballers
Club León footballers
Expatriate footballers in Mexico
Soccer players from Dallas
American expatriate sportspeople in Mexico